The Dragon is a 8,105-foot-elevation summit located in the Grand Canyon, in Coconino County of Arizona, US. It is situated north of the Hindu Amphitheater, and about ~4.5 miles north-northwest of Shiva Temple, and ~2.5 mi north of Dragon Head. Both of the Dragon landforms are on a connected ridgeline, (Dragon Head being the ridgeline terminus), defining two south trending canyon watersheds – Dragon Creek, (east), and (Upper)-Crystal Creek (Arizona), (west).Aerial photos of The Dragon and Dragon Head were taken as Draft Environmental Impact Statement (DEIS) studies for public flight-path routes within the entire Grand Canyon.

Geology & biology
The geology of The Dragon prominence is a ~250 to 300 ft layer of cliff-forming, whitish Kaibab Limestone. Its hardness supports an approximately horizontal tableland of Ponderosa Pine forest.

Below the Kaibab is an even larger unit of the slope-forming Toroweap Formation. The slope is modestly vegetated, and has large areas of erosion debris, with no obvious interlaced cliffs. The Toroweap Formation rests upon a ~400+ ft cliff of cliff-former Coconino Sandstone. 

The Coconino Sandstone (buff/(reddish-white)), rests upon a relatively massive unit of Hermit Formation (Hermit Shale). The slopes are vegetated, also with large sections of burnt-red-brown Hermit debris.

References

External links

 Aerial view (forested) – The Dragon (Arizona)

Grand Canyon
Grand Canyon National Park
Colorado Plateau
Landforms of Coconino County, Arizona
Mountains of Arizona
Mountains of Coconino County, Arizona
North American 2000 m summits